Club O'Connor is a Canadian music variety television series which aired on CBC Television in 1957.

Premise
This series featured pianist Billy O'Connor with a house band of Jackie Richardson (leader, bass), Vic Centro (accordion), Ken Gill (guitar), Johnny Lindon (drums, vocals) and Sylvia Murphy (vocals). Musical arrangements were created by Bill Isbister. Visiting artists during the series included Jack Duffy (comedian, vocalist, 19 July 1957), Jack Groob (violin, 28 June 1957), Hal Harvey, Joey Hollingsworth (dancer), Georges Lafleche (singer), Pat Rafferty (The Dumbbells), The Rhythmaires (21 June 1957) and the Taylor Twins (dancers, 5 July 1957).

Scheduling
Club O'Connor occupied The Plouffe Family's time slot between seasons. This half-hour series was broadcast Fridays at 8:30 p.m. (Eastern time) from 7 June to 27 September 1957.

References

External links
 

CBC Television original programming
1950s Canadian music television series
1957 Canadian television series debuts
1957 Canadian television series endings
Black-and-white Canadian television shows